Zákányfalu is a village in located in the Csurgó District of Somogy County, Hungary.

History
Formerly part of Zákány, Zákányfalu became an independent village since October 20, 2002. The northern part of the settlement took up the name Zákányfalu. In the village there were 537 people in 2007 and a total of 238 apartments.

References

Populated places in Somogy County